Helcogramma atauroensis, the red-anal triplefin, is a species of triplefin blenny in the genus Helcogramma. it was described by Ronald Frick and Mark V Erdmann in 2017.

References

atauroensis
Fish described in 2017